Thomas Butler, 10th Earl of Ormond and 3rd Earl of Ossory  PC (Ire) ( – 1614), was an influential courtier in London at the court of Elizabeth I. He was Lord Treasurer of Ireland from 1559 to his death. He fought for the crown in the Rough Wooing, the Desmond Rebellions, and Tyrone's Rebellion. He fought his rival, Gerald FitzGerald, 14th Earl of Desmond in the Battle of Affane in 1565.

Birth and origins 

Thomas was born about February 1531 in souther Ireland. He was the eldest son of James Butler and his wife Joan FitzGerald. At the time of his birth, his father was still heir apparent but would succeed as 9th Earl of Ormond in 1539. His father's family was the Butler dynasty, an Old English family that descended from Theobald Walter, who had been appointed Chief Butler of Ireland by King Henry II in 1177.

Thomas's mother was a child of James FitzGerald, 10th Earl of Desmond. Her family, the Geraldines, also were an Old English family. It was once believed that his parents had married about 1520, but this is now known to be impossible as, in 1521-2, his father was briefly betrothed to his English cousin Anne Boleyn. James and Joan did not marry until about 1528, with Thomas as their first child being born three, rather than eleven, years later.

He was one of seven brothers, which are listed in his father's article. Nothing seems to be known about the sisters he probably had.

Early life 
In 1539 his grandfather died and his father succeeded as the 9th earl of Ormond. Born in Ireland, Butler was sent to London in May 1544 aged about 13, to be brought up at the English court where he adopted English speech, dress, and manners, as well as the Protestant religion.

Elizabeth I 
The future Lord Ormond and the future Queen Elizabeth met in London as children. Thomas, the "son of an Irish Earl", and Elizabeth, the "illegitimate daughter of Henry VIII", shared a common experience: neither was well-treated by the other young nobles at court. They were distant (4th) cousins through her mother, Anne Boleyn, whose paternal grandmother, Lady Margaret Butler, was a daughter of the 7th Earl (open the collapsed family tree below).

Elizabeth called him her "black husband."

Earl of Ormond 
On 28 October 1546, when Butler was 15, his father, the 9th Earl of Ormond died in London after having been poisoned during a banquet at Ely House, probably at the instigation of Anthony St Leger, who was Lord Deputy of Ireland and a political opponent. Thomas Butler succeeded as the 10th Earl of Ormond and the 3rd Earl of Ossory. He became a ward of the King.

Ormond, as he now was, was knighted on 20 February 1547, at the coronation of Edward VI. On 10 September 1547 during the Rough Wooing he served at the Battle of Pinkie under Edward Seymour, 1st Duke of Somerset against the Scots. In 1554, during the reign of Queen Mary, Ormond helped to put down Wyatt's rebellion.

His mother remarried to Francis Bryan in 1548, and then to Gerald FitzGerald, 14th Earl of Desmond in 1551.

In 1554 his illegitimate son, Piers FitzThomas Butler of Duisk, was born. There were unfounded rumours that Elizabeth was the mother, something which was particularly impossible at the time of Piers's birth when the Princess was away from court, imprisoned, then under house arrest, and frequent public questioning for her alleged complicity in the Wyatt Rebellion. Piers's son, Edward would become the 1st Viscount Galmoye.

On 17 November 1558 Elizabeth succeeded Mary as Queen of England. On 26 August 1559 Ormond was appointed Lord Treasurer of Ireland by the Queen, which automatically made him a privy councillor of Ireland.

First marriage 
About 1559 Ormond married his first wife, Elizabeth Berkeley, daughter of Thomas Berkeley, 6th Baron Berkeley and Anne Savage. His bride was considered a beauty at the court. However, the marriage was not happy and she had lovers. They separated in 1564 without having had children, but she refused a divorce. She would finally die on 1 September 1582 in Bristol. That meant that Ormond did not have an heir and that according to the normal rule of succession, his younger brother Edmund was his heir presumptive.

In the 1560s Ormond built the Tudor manor-house extension to Ormonde Castle on the banks of the River Suir in Carrick-on-Suir, County Tipperary. All of this was done to provide Elizabeth with a suitable palace at which to stay when she travelled to Ireland. Elizabeth planned twice to visit him there: once in 1602 (which visit was cancelled by her illness); and again in 1603. She died, however, before the planned visit could take place. It is known that Elizabeth appreciated Thomas's effort, and was—as she was with all of her maternal cousins—very fond of him. Thomas survived Elizabeth by 11 years.

Irish wars

Affane 

Much of Ormond's life was taken up with a fierce feud with his hereditary foes, the Earls of Desmond. The Desmonds were the Ormonds' neighbours on the western and southern sides. Despite their enmity, these two families were both more or less Gaelicized Old English and had intermarried many times; the last such marriage having been that of Ormond's parents. The Desmond rebellions should also be seen in the wider picture of the Tudor conquest of Ireland.

In 1560 his mother's intervention secured a peaceful outcome to a stand-off at Bohermore (known as "the battle that never was"). However, only a bit more than a month after her death on 2 January 1565, on 8 February 1565, the two sides fought the private Battle of Affane, in which her husband Gerald FitzGerald, 14th Earl of Desmond was taken prisoner by the Ormond faction after her son Edmund had shot him into the hip with his pistol. Lords Ormond and Desmond were called to London and promised to keep the peace.

Ormond was that summer high in favour with the Queen.

First Desmond rebellion 

The first Desmond Rebellion (1569–1573) was started by James fitz Maurice FitzGerald, captain of the Desmond forces in the earl's absence. He was supported by many Irish in southern Ireland but also by some of Ormond's six brothers, notably Edmund. The rebellion was directed against Henry Sidney the Lord Deputy of Ireland. Ormond returned to Ireland landing at Waterford in July 1569. His brothers submitted quickly.

However, Edmund, Edward and Piers were attainted in April 1570 by an act of the Irish Parliament. That meant that Edmund ceased to be Ormond's heir presumptive and the next brother, John Butler of Kilcash, took his place. However, not for long as John died on 10 May 1570. John's eldest son, Walter, therefore became heir presumptive. James fitz Maurice FitzGerald surrendered on 23 February 1573 and Gerald followed in September ending the first Desmond rebellion.

Lord Desmond was released about 1573 and allowed to return from England to Ireland. James FitzMaurice FitzGerald left for the continent.

Second Desmond rebellion 
The second Desmond Rebellion (1579–1583) was triggered by the landing of James fitz Maurice FitzGerald at Dingle On 17 June 1579. Lord Desmond rose in rebellion. Ormond was appointed governor of Munster and sent to Ireland.

Both rebellions desolated Munster for many years. Ormond was a Protestant belonging to the Church of Ireland and threw his great influence on the side of Queen Elizabeth I and her ministers in their efforts to crush the rebels, although he was motivated as much by factional rivalry with the Desmond dynasty as by religion. He had command of the Royal Irish Army tasked with the suppression of the rebellions, which he eventually accomplished.

Second marriage and children 
At the age of 51, having been freed by the death of his estranged first wife on 1 September 1582, Ormond remarried Elizabeth Sheffield on 9 November in London. She was the daughter of John Sheffield, 2nd Baron Sheffield and Douglas, daughter of William Howard, 1st Baron Howard of Effingham.

 
Thomas and Elizabeth had three children:
 John (1584–1589), died young;
 Elizabeth (before 1593 – 1628), married 1st her first cousin Theobald, son of Thomas's brother Edmund, but Theobald died childless in 1613; she married 2ndly Richard Preston, 1st Earl of Desmond, and had one daughter, Elizabeth Preston;
 Thomas (before 1601 – 1606), died young on 17 January 1606 and is buried in Carrick-on-Suir.

Later life and third marriage 

In 1580 Ormond improved Kilkenny Castle by building the great gallery.

In spring 1588, the Queen made Ormond a Knight of the Garter. When in the summer of that year the Spanish Armada menaced England, he was with her at the review of the troops at Tilbury where she gave the patriotic speech to the troop at Tilbury. He had at that occasion the honour to carry the sword of state before her.

In 1600 he helped to suppress Tyrone's Rebellion. Between April 1600 and June 1600 he was held captive by Owny MacRory O'More who had invaded Munster with Irish forces from Leinster.

Ormond's second wife died in November 1600. In June 1601 Ormond, aged 70, married his third wife, Helena Barry, daughter of David de Barry, 5th Viscount Buttevant. It was her second marriage, her first husband having been John Power. The marriage remained childless.

He was further honoured by being appointed vice-admiral of Leinster in 1602.

An anonymous manuscript originating from the library of the Irish College at Louvain tells us the following anecdote.

The 10th Earl of Ormond, as an old blind man, celebrated Christmas with his family at Carrick Castle. The adults sat at the table, while the children played on the floor around them. The Earl heard a noise behind him and asked who it was. He was told it was little Jemmy of Kilcash, Walter's grandson whipping his top. The Earl asked for the boy to be brought to him, held him on his lap, and caressed his hair. He sighed and said "My family shall be much oppressed and brought very low, but by this boy it shall be restored again and in his time be in greater splendour than ever it has been".

In 1613 his son-in-law Lord Tulleophelim died childless in his forties. A son of Lord Thomond asked for his widow Elizabeth's hand, but the King decided that she should marry Lord Dingwall, a favourite from his days in Scotland.

Death and timeline 
The tenth Lord Ormond died on 22 November 1614 at Carrick and was buried at St Canice's Cathedral, Kilkenny. 

As the Earl died without legally recognised male issue, and his younger brother Edmund was attainted, the Earldom reverted in the male line, to the Kilcash cadet branch, which had started with the third brother John Butler of Kilcash and whose living representative was John's son Walter.

Offices held 
Included:
Treasurer of Ireland (1559–1614)
Lieutenant of County Tipperary (1575)
Lieutenant of County Kilkenny (1575)
Lord General of the Forces in Munster (1582–1583)
General of the Forces in Leinster (1594–1596)
Lieutenant-General of the all Forces in Ireland (1597)
Vice-Admiral of Leinster (1602)

Notes and references

Notes

Citations

Sources 

  – 1603 to 1642
 
 
 
  – The Middle Deanery
  – 1613 to 1641
  – N to R (for Ormond)
  – Scotland and Ireland
 
  – (PDF downloadable from given URL)
 
 
  – (for timeline)
 
 
 
  – Viscounts
 
 
 
  – Ormond Castle

Further reading 
 

1614 deaths
Thomas
Butler
1530s births
17th-century Anglo-Irish people
Earls of Ormond (Ireland)
Irish Anglicans
People from County Tipperary
People of the Nine Years' War (Ireland)
People of the Second Desmond Rebellion